Joshua Green (born November 16, 1977) is a Canadian former professional ice hockey center who played most notably in the National Hockey League (NHL).

Playing career
Green was originally drafted by the Los Angeles Kings in the second round as the 30th overall pick in 1996. Green was selected from the Western Hockey League, where he was a stand out for the Medicine Hat Tigers, Swift Current Broncos and the Portland Winter Hawks.

Green left the WHL during the 1997–98 season, and made his professional debut with the Fredericton Canadiens of the American Hockey League. Josh then made his NHL debut the following 1998–99 season with the Kings before finishing the year with affiliate, the Springfield Falcons.

At the 1999 NHL Entry Draft, the Kings traded Green to the New York Islanders along with Olli Jokinen, Mathieu Biron, and a first round selection in 1999 for Žigmund Pálffy, Bryan Smolinski, Marcel Cousineau and a fourth round selection in 1999.

Green started the 1999–2000 season with the Lowell Lock Monsters before he was called up to the Islanders, scoring 12 goals in 49 games. Josh was then traded by the Islanders, for the second consecutive year at the Draft, along with Eric Brewer and a second-round selection in the 2000 entry draft to the Edmonton Oilers for Roman Hamrlík.

The 2000–01 season was almost entirely wiped out for Green when he suffered a dislocated shoulder in his second game with Oilers affiliate, the Hamilton Bulldogs. Green recovered to play in 3 playoff games with the Oilers. In the 2001–02 season, Green played his first full season in the NHL appearing in a career-high 61 games.

In his third season with the Oilers in 2002-03, Green was traded by the Oilers to the New York Rangers for a conditional pick in 2004 on December 12, 2002. After playing in just 4 games with the Rangers, Green was claimed off waivers by the Washington Capitals on January 15, 2003.

On July 17, 2003, Green signed a one-year contract with the Calgary Flames. Green played in 36 games the 2003-04 season with the Flames before he was claimed off of waivers by the New York Rangers on March 6, 2004.

During the NHL lock-out, Green was signed to an AHL contract with the Vancouver Canucks affiliate, the Manitoba Moose. Helping guide the Moose to a successful season, Green was signed by the Canucks to a one-year contract on August 23, 2005. Josh was primarily used as an injury reserve forward for the Canucks in the 2005–06 season. Proving he was a solid role player the Canucks, Green was re-signed to a one-year extension where he appeared in 57 games in the 2006–07 season.

After spending the 2007–08 season in Austria with EC Red Bull Salzburg, Green returned to the NHL, signing a one-year deal with the Anaheim Ducks on July 22, 2008. In the 2008–09 season, Green was assigned to Ducks affiliate the Iowa Chops to provide a veteran and scoring presence. Injury limited Green to only 39 games with the Chops. In posting 24 points with the Chops, Green was called up for the Ducks playoff run and appeared in 5 post season games.

On July 9, 2009, Green signed a one-year contract with MODO Hockey of the Swedish Elitserien. After scoring 12 goals in 47 games in a checking role with Modo for the 2009–10 season, Green returned to the Anaheim Ducks organization signing a one-year contract on July 12, 2010.

On July 3, 2011, Green signed a one-year, two-way contract with the Edmonton Oilers. He was placed on waivers on October 2, 2011, with the purpose of being assigned with the Oklahoma City Barons. Green signed a one-year minor league deal with the Oklahoma City Barons of the American Hockey League.

Green played his last four seasons in the Finnish Liiga, with Tappara and KooKoo before announcing his retirement from professional hockey on May 15, 2017.

Career statistics

References

External links

1977 births
Anaheim Ducks players
Calgary Flames players
Camrose Kodiaks players
Canadian ice hockey centres
EC Red Bull Salzburg players
Edmonton Oilers players
Fredericton Canadiens players
Hamilton Bulldogs (AHL) players
Ice hockey people from Alberta
Iowa Stars players
KooKoo players
Living people
Los Angeles Kings draft picks
Los Angeles Kings players
Lowell Lock Monsters players
Manitoba Moose players
Medicine Hat Tigers players
Modo Hockey players
New York Islanders players
New York Rangers players
Oklahoma City Barons players
People from Camrose, Alberta
Portland Winterhawks players
Springfield Falcons players
Swift Current Broncos players
Syracuse Crunch players
Tappara players
Vancouver Canucks players
Washington Capitals players
Canadian expatriate ice hockey players in Austria
Canadian expatriate ice hockey players in Finland
Canadian expatriate ice hockey players in Sweden